Gobbi is an Italian surname. Notable people with the surname include:

 Alberto Gobbi (born 1956), Italian surgeon and researcher
 Alfredo Gobbi (1912-1965), Argentine violin player, composer and bandleader during the Golden Age of tango
 Alois Gobbi (1842-1932), Hungarian violinist
 Henri Gobbi (19th century), Hungarian classical composer and piano professor
 Hilda Gobbi (1913–1988), Hungarian actress and philanthropist
 John Gobbi (born 1981), Swiss ice hockey player
 Luca Gobbi (born 1971), San Marino former footballer
 Marina Gobbi (born 1989), female Brazilian recurve archer
 Massimo Gobbi (born 1980), Italian football player
 Michele Gobbi (born 1977), former Italian cyclist
 Pasqualino Gobbi (fl. early 18th century), cleric
 Sergio Gobbi (born 1938), born as Sergio Ehrlich, Italian-French filmmaker
 Stefano Gobbi (1930–2011), Italian Roman Catholic priest
 Tito Gobbi (1913–1984), Italian operatic baritone

See also 
 29568 Gobbi-Belcredi, main-belt minor planet

Italian-language surnames
it:Gobbi